Alliance Trust plc is a publicly traded investment and financial services company, established in 1888 and headquartered in Dundee, Scotland. It is listed on the London Stock Exchange and is a constituent of the FTSE 250 Index. It is one of the largest investment trusts in the UK.

History
The Alliance Trust plc was formed by the 1888 merger of three Dundee-based mortgage and land companies: the Dundee Investment Company, the Dundee Mortgage and Trust Investment Company and the Oregon and Washington Trust (which was set up to provide loans to immigrant farmers on the West Coast of the United States). Many prominent figures in Dundee invested some of their money in the Alliance Trust and its predecessors, including merchants, ship owners, textile manufacturers and businessman such as Sir John Leng. The company subsequently expanded into other asset classes. In 1918 the firm agreed to share premises and other costs with the Western & Hawaiian Investment Company, a mortgage lender which initially focused its business on sugar planters in Hawaii before expanding. Five years later it was renamed The Second Alliance Trust, although no formal merger between the two took place until 2006.

The Trusts later moved into fixed income investing in the 1920s and 30s, before adding significant quantities of shares to their portfolios in the late 1950s. A savings division was established by Alliance Trust in 1986, offering pensions and other investment products. A formal merger with The Second Alliance Trust was finally conducted in 2006, as the investment strategies of the two companies had come to closely resemble each other.

The company left its headquarters of over 90 years, Meadow House in Dundee's Reform Street on 1 June 2009 for a purpose-built facility on 8 West Marketgait in Dundee City Centre. 

In 2011, it was reported that University of Dundee Archive Services had become custodians of the Alliance Trust's extensive archives.

Following criticism by Elliott Advisors, an activist shareholder, Katherine Garrett-Cox stood down as Chief Executive and left the company in March 2016.

Investment strategy

In December 2016, the board announced that the Trust would change its investment philosophy to a multi-manager model in a bid to improve performance. In March 2017, the Trust's shareholders approved the change in approach. The Trust then formally appointed Willis Towers Watson (WTW) as investment manager with effect from 1 April 2017.

Former operations
Until October 2018, Alliance Trust was the parent company of Alliance Trust Savings Limited, an execution-only trading platform. The business was sold to Interactive Investor for £40m; the sale included the office building at West Marketgait, Dundee.

References

Financial services companies established in 1888
Financial services companies of Scotland
Investment management companies of the United Kingdom
Scottish brands
1888 establishments in Scotland
Companies based in Dundee
British companies established in 1888
Companies listed on the London Stock Exchange
Publicly traded companies
1888 establishments in the United Kingdom
Financial services companies of the United Kingdom